Lord Frederick Spencer Hamilton (13 October 1856 – 11 August 1928) was a Conservative Party politician in the United Kingdom, the sixth son and thirteenth child of James Hamilton, 1st Duke of Abercorn and Lady Louisa Jane Russell.

He was Second Secretary of the Diplomatic Service (1877–1884) and Member of Parliament (MP) for Manchester South West (1885–1886) and North Tyrone (1892–1895).  Lord Frederick also wrote the three- volume set of books, The Days Before Yesterday, Vanished Pomps of Yesterday and Here, There and Everywhere,  which were first published in 1920 by Hodder and Stoughton Ltd, London. These give vivid, sometimes amusing and always well-written accounts of his early life, life in the diplomatic service, and travels.

While serving as aide-de-camp to Lord Lansdowne, then Governor-General of Canada, in Ottawa, In January 1887, Lord Frederick was the first person to introduce skiing to Canada, using skis he had brought from Russia. As he recounts, he used to "slide down the toboggan slides at Ottawa on them, to universal derision". He was told they were "unsuited to Canadian conditions, and would never be popular in Canada".

From 1896 to 1900, he was editor of the Pall Mall Magazine. He never married and died without children.

Ancestry

Works 
 ,  by Lord Frederic [sic] Hamilton,1919 * ,  by Lord Frederick Hamilton, 1920
 , by Lord Frederic [sic] Hamilton, 1921

References

External links 

 
 
 
 
 

1856 births
1928 deaths
Irish Conservative Party MPs
Conservative Party (UK) MPs for English constituencies
Members of the Parliament of the United Kingdom for County Tyrone constituencies (1801–1922)
Younger sons of dukes
UK MPs 1885–1886
UK MPs 1892–1895